Ferenc "Frank" Arok  (20 January 1932 – 12 January 2021) was a Yugoslavian-Australian ethnic Hungarian association football player and coach.

Career
Arok played for FK Jedinstvo in Yugoslavia during the 1950s before coaching. In the early 1960s Arok coached FK Novi Sad and FK Vojvodina before moving to Australia. In Australia Arok coached St George Saints, South Melbourne FC, Port Melbourne, Gippsland Falcons, and Sydney Olympic, and the Australian national team. Arok coached Australia in 48 A internationals between 1983 and 1989. In the 1990 Australia Day honours, Arok was made a Member of the Order of Australia (AM) for "service to soccer, particularly as the Australian national coach". 

He died on 12 January 2021 in Serbia, aged 88.

References

External links
 TWG article
 

1932 births
2021 deaths
Yugoslav footballers
Serbian football managers
Hungarian football managers
Australian soccer coaches
Yugoslav emigrants to Australia
Australia national soccer team managers
Sydney Olympic FC managers
Expatriate soccer managers in Australia
South Melbourne FC managers
Association football defenders
Members of the Order of Australia
Serbian people of Hungarian descent
Hungarian emigrants to Australia
Australian expatriate soccer coaches
Serbian expatriate football managers
Hungarian expatriate football managers
Deaths from the COVID-19 pandemic in Serbia
People from Kanjiža